Dopiewo  is a village in Poznań County, Greater Poland Voivodeship, in west-central Poland. It is the seat of the gmina (administrative district) called Gmina Dopiewo.

The village has a population of 2,733.

History
During World War II, Dopiewo was annexed to Germany from 1939 to 1945 as part of Landkreis Posen, Reichsgau Wartheland.

References

Villages in Poznań County